"I Can't Say No!" is a song by Lea Rue written by Yves Gaillard, Emma Lauwers, Simen Auke and Mikkel Christiansen and produced by Yves Gaillard. The song was very popular in Belgium reaching number 2 on the Ultratop Belgian Singles Chart.

A remix by Norwegian DJs Broiler was also a chart success on VG-lista, the Norwegian Singles Charts and on Sverigetopplistan, the Swedish Singles Chart. A much lengthier remix by Filterheadz was also released.

Track list

Charts

Weekly charts

Year-end charts

Certifications

References

2015 singles
2015 songs